Luis Estrada may refer to:

 Luis Estrada (footballer) (born 1948), Mexican footballer
 Luis Estrada (director) (born 1962), Mexican film director
 Luis Estrada (volleyball) (born 2000), Cuban volleyball player